Oregon Route 8, also known as Oregon Highway 8, is an Oregon state highway which serves the western suburbs of Portland. The road is locally known as Canyon Road and Tualatin Valley Highway, and travels through the center of the Tualatin Valley. Oregon 8 is located entirely within Washington County. The portion of the route from US 26 to Oregon Route 47 is part of the National Highway System, listed as a principal arterial.

Route description
The eastern terminus of OR 8 is an interchange with U.S. Route 26 (which is, at that point, the Sunset Highway) just west of the Portland city limits and the Washington-Multnomah county line. Initially, it is also known as Canyon Road, since it comes out of the gulch in which the Sunset Highway runs.  The official designation, beginning from the eastern terminus, is the Tualatin Valley Highway No. 29 (see Oregon highways and routes).

Continuing west, OR 8 enters the suburb of Beaverton, and after its interchange with Oregon Route 217, a freeway, its posted name changes to the Tualatin Valley (TV) Highway at Hocken Avenue. It comes within one block of Oregon Route 10, running parallel but never intersecting, although commuters often use surface streets to change between the highways.

TV Highway continues west as an expressway out of Beaverton, through the communities of unincorporated urban Washington County, including Aloha, where it runs right next to chipmaker Intel's facilities. The highway continues into the Hillsboro neighborhoods of Reedville and Witch Hazel, where it intersects with Cornelius Pass Road at Reedville. It then continues into the city proper of Hillsboro, running north–south as 10th Avenue before turning east–west with traffic split into a one-way pair. Westbound traffic runs as Baseline Street and eastbound traffic runs on Oak Street. In downtown Hillsboro it receives the northern terminus of Oregon Route 219, which is 1st Avenue.

After passing through downtown Hillsboro, OR 8 moves westward through the adjoined towns of Cornelius and Forest Grove, passing next to Pacific University. At Cornelius the road is again split into a one-way pair, with westbound traffic running on Adair Street, and eastbound on Baseline. In Forest Grove, it intersects with Oregon Route 47, where it becomes part of the Nehalem Highway No. 102. TV Highway continues as OR 47 south to McMinnville. In downtown Forest Grove the road splits again, with eastbound traffic running on 19th Street, and westbound on Pacific Avenue. West of Forest Grove, OR 8 is known as Gales Creek Road, which is not actually a state highway; after passing through some farmland west of Forest Grove, including the community of Gales Creek, OR 8 reaches its western terminus in an intersection with Oregon Route 6 south of the community of Glenwood.

History
The section between Beaverton and Hillsboro was built around 1918. Constructed of cement, it partly replaced a county road built of dirt that ran on the southern side of the railroad tracks. The earlier road came from Portland via Bertha Blvd. on Farmington Road and veered north on what is now Kinnaman Road until 209th Avenue in Reedville, where it then ran parallel to the rail tracks. At Witch Hazel it then followed the modern Witch Hazel and River roads into Hillsboro proper.

In March 1919, Hillsboro elected to have the highway moved from Main Street two blocks south to Baseline Street (eastbound traffic was later moved to Oak Street). Washington County planners in March 1953 decided to have the highway widened to four lanes.

Major intersections
Note: mileposts do not reflect actual mileage due to realignments.

See also
Transportation in Portland, Oregon

References

008
Transportation in Hillsboro, Oregon
Transportation in Beaverton, Oregon
Transportation in Multnomah County, Oregon
1957 establishments in Oregon
Forest Grove, Oregon
Cornelius, Oregon